Sir Charles Turner, 2nd Baronet (28 January 1773 –1 February 1810) was an English politician.

He was the son of Sir Charles Turner, Bt of Kirkleatham Hall, Yorkshire by his second wife Mary, the daughter of James Shuttleworth of Gawthorpe Hall.

He joined the Army as a Cornet in the Royal Horse Guards in 1789, was a lieutenant in 1794-5 and became a captain in the 4th West Yorkshire militia in 1797.

He was elected at the 1796 general election as a Member of Parliament (MP) for Kingston upon Hull,
and held the seat until the 1802 general election.

He died in 1810 aged only 37, leaving his Kirkleatham estate to his widow. He had married Teresa, the daughter of Sir William Gleadowe-Newcomen, 1st Baronet. She later married Henry Vansittart, the High Sheriff of Yorkshire for 1820.

References

Bibliography 

1773 births
1810 deaths
Turner baronets
British MPs 1796–1800
Members of the Parliament of Great Britain for English constituencies
Members of the Parliament of the United Kingdom for English constituencies
Royal Horse Guards officers
UK MPs 1801–1802